Crying for the Carolines is a 1930 short film made by Leon Schlesinger. The theme for this short film is played on the Wurlitzer organ formerly installed at Warner Brothers studios by Milton Charles, a theatre organist during the silent era of film. He is dubbed the 'Singing Organist' in the film.

The film, which was recorded on Western Electric apparatus, was the only one made in a planned series called Spooney Melodies. The film is a music video to advertise the song sung by Charles. The organ music was written by Frank Marsales, who would go on to write the musical arrangements for the Merrie Melodies series, including the cartoon Smile, Darn Ya, Smile!

Plot
The films open, with art deco style animation, set to organ music. After, some animation. It cuts to Charles playing the organ and singing Cryin' for the Carolines, a song written by Harry Warren, Sam Lewis, and Joe Young the same year. The film's animation which is shown throughout the film includes, a forest, a city and a sun shining over a country plain. Milton Charles is portrayed in voice and live action footage throughout the short, as he sings the song.

Background 
The song, Cryin' for the Carolines, is originally featured in the 1930 Warner Bros. film Spring is Here, which was issued on the sound system Vitaphone, which was accomplished with a record player which played a disk in time with the projector, which would be higher quality than sound-on-film. In the film, the song was sung by The Brox Sisters.

Availability 
The planned series was short-lived, with Warner Brothers instead going for the Merrie Melodies series, beginning with 1931's Lady, Play Your Mandolin!. This short is available on the Looney Tunes Golden Collection: Volume 6's 3rd disc.

Reception 
Crying for the Carolines was reviewed by the magazine Photoplay in its 1930 December issue. The magazine spoke positively about the film, citing that the film is a "distinct relief from the monotony of many sound shorts". The magazine also said that the short is notable for the "beauty of the results obtained", from the painting and the drawings featured in the film, "as well as the novelty of the film."

References

External links 
 Crying for the Carolines on YouTube
 Crying for the Carolines on IMDb

1930 films
Music videos
1930 short films
Films produced by Leon Schlesinger
Films scored by Frank Marsales
American musical films
1930 musical films
American black-and-white films
1930s American films